Vilém Goppold von Lobsdorf (25 May 1869 – 15 June 1943) was a Bohemian fencer and Olympic medalist in sabre competition. He received a bronze medal in sabre individual and in sabre team at the 1908 Summer Olympics in London.

References

External links
 Biography of Vilém Goppold von Lobsdorf 

1869 births
1943 deaths
Czech male fencers
Fencers at the 1908 Summer Olympics
Fencers at the 1912 Summer Olympics
Olympic fencers of Bohemia
Olympic bronze medalists for Bohemia
Olympic medalists in fencing
Medalists at the 1908 Summer Olympics
Sportspeople from Prague